The 1987 Virginia Slims of Houston was a women's tennis tournament played on outdoor clay courts at the Westside Tennis Club in Houston, Texas in the United States and was part of the Category 3 tier of the 1987 WTA Tour. It was the 17th edition of the tournament and was held from April 20 through April 26, 1987. Third-seeded Chris Evert won the singles title and earned $30,000 first-prize money.

Finals

Singles
 Chris Evert defeated  Martina Navratilova 3–6, 6–1, 7–6(7–4)
 It was Evert's 2nd singles title of the year and the 150th of her career.

Doubles
 Kathy Jordan /  Martina Navratilova defeated  Zina Garrison /  Lori McNeil 6–2, 6–4

See also
 Evert–Navratilova rivalry

References

External links
 ITF tournament edition details
 Tournament draws

Virginia Slims of Houston
Virginia Slims of Houston
Virginia Slims of Houston
Virginia Slims of Houston
Virginia Slims of Houston
Virginia Slims of Houston